, is a Japanese singer, songwriter and musician under the FlyBlue label. He's also former vocalist of the Japanese band Field of View.

Biography

The beginning of his career started in 1990, when he became vocalist of band Missing Peace and one year later in band Pandora. U-ya is known for being the former vocalist of Field of View rock-band under Zain Records label. They disbanded in 2002 after their final live tour. In 2003 he started his activity as a soloist under the Merdack label. In 2009 Asaoka established his own label Fly-blue with new website. In 2011, Asaoka appeared as a guest member of Zard live tour What a beautiful memory: Forever you. In 2012, he appeared in Being Inc. anniversary concert Being Legend Live Tour with almost all ex.members from Field of View. In 2015, he made guest appearance in television variety show Ariyoshi Hanseikai hosted by Ariyoshi Hiroiki.

On 26 January 2020, Asaoka Yuuya's official website announced a new compilation album to celebrate the 25th anniversary of the debut of Field of the View with 5 new songs and previously unpublished songs. The band will reform for two days live in Tokyo and Osaka for the first time since 2012.

Discography
So far he has released 9 singles, 9 studio albums, 4 mini albums, 2 compilation albums and 1 acoustic album

Singles

Studio albums

Mini albums

DVD

See also
Field of View

References

External links
 U-ya profile on Merdack Website 
 Old Official Website 
 U-ya Asaoka at Oricon 
 Official Website

Japanese lyricists
Japanese male singer-songwriters
1969 births
Living people
Singers from Tokyo
20th-century Japanese male singers
20th-century Japanese singers